Jukka Ylipulli (born 6 February 1963 in Rovaniemi) is a Finnish former nordic combined skier who competed during the 1980s and early 1990s. He won a bronze medal in the individual Nordic combined at the 1984 Winter Olympics in Sarajevo.

Ylipulli also has two FIS Nordic World Ski Championships medals both in the team event, a silver in 1984 and a bronze in 1985.

He is the brother of ski jumpers Tuomo Ylipulli and Raimo Ylipulli.

See also
List of Olympic medalist families

References

External links
 
 

1963 births
Living people
People from Rovaniemi
Finnish male Nordic combined skiers
Nordic combined skiers at the 1984 Winter Olympics
Nordic combined skiers at the 1988 Winter Olympics
Olympic Nordic combined skiers of Finland
Olympic medalists in Nordic combined
FIS Nordic World Ski Championships medalists in Nordic combined
Medalists at the 1984 Winter Olympics
Olympic bronze medalists for Finland
Sportspeople from Lapland (Finland)
20th-century Finnish people